Michael Dreyer (born 1953) is a German artist, author, and director, who analyzes the basis of art. He creates, analyses and proves the connection between the presentation, history, attraction and forms of Art. Since 1982, Dreyer had worked as a professor at Merz Akademie in Stuttgart, Germany, where he had been teaching visual communication.

Career
In his art pieces, Dreyer works with sculptures, environments, movies, theater pieces, musical issues, graphics and texts, with which he dissects the modules of their connection to each other.

In 2006, Dreyer founded the exhibition space W.O. Scheibe Museum in Stuttgart, where he organised the "Palindrom". He also exhibited "Oben und Unten mit Rex Whistler & Friends" with Tom Holert in 2009, as well as "white albums" with Diedrich Diederichsen, Helmut Draxler, Julian Göthe, Wolfgang Paukner and Hans-Jürgen Hafner in 2010.

Works

Single exhibitions, performances and movies
The following is a list of Dreyer's single works:
 1986: Der geliehene Ernstfall, (zs. mit Diedrich Diederichsen und Lucius Burckhardt) im Rahmen der Ausstellung "Erkundungen", Messe Stuttgart
 1996: Shorty, Film, Performance (Berlin, Marburg, Stuttgart, Hamburg) (zs. mit Sharon Lockhart, Kamera, Schorsch Kamerun u.v.a.)
 2004: Abschaffung von Prügelsprache, Ausstellung, Performance, Filme, Publikation (Künstlerhaus Stuttgart), ; Galerie Meerrettich, Berlin
 2006: Pianistin, eine Aufnahme 'elektronischer Klänge' von Stockhausen anhörend, Ausstellung, Performance, Künstlerhaus Stuttgart
 2010: White Albums, Ausstellung, Publikation, zs. mit Julian Göthe, Hans Jürgen Hafner, Michael Paukner, W.O. Scheibe Museum, Stuttgart
 2011: Theorie des Armen Publikums / Towards A Poor Audience, Hermes und der Pfau, Stuttgart; Triple Negation – Double Props, I WE NOW INTERRUPT FOR A COMMERCIAL, Gastkurator Clemens Krümmel, Aanant & Zoo, Berlin
 2012: Machen die immer (noch) das Gleiche?, NGBK, Berlin

Group exhibitions
The following is a list of Dreyer's works with a group:
 1998: Albert vs. History, Kunsthalle Basel, kuratiert von Albert Oehlen
 1999: Pay with Me, Bethanien, Berlin, kuratiert von Andreas Fanizadeh und Eva Meier; Koether, Bohlen, Richter" Galerie Esther Freund, Wien, kuratiert von Albert Oehlen
 2006: Shandyismus. Autorenschaft als Genre, Secession Wien; Kunsthaus Dresden, kuratiert von Helmut Draxler
 2007: Re-Dis-Play, Kunstverein Heidelberg, kuratiert von Catharina Gebbers; Kommando Giotto Bandoni, Galerie Gio Marconi, Mailand, kuratiert von André Butzer
 2009: Palindrom, mit Tom Holert, Hermes und der Pfau/W.O. Scheibe Museum, Stuttgart
 2011: INDEX 11, Kunsthaus Hamburg; Bild und Träger – und ein Pfeiler aus Sanssouci, BKV Potsdam, curated by Hans Jürgen Hafner
 2012: From the Age of the Poets, Aanant & Zoo, Berlin

Literature
 Michael Dreyer – Theorie und Plastik, published by Helmut Draxler, 2016.
Dreyer, Michael – Holert, Tom (Hrsg.): PALINDROM. Oben und Unten mit Rex Whistler & Friends, Stuttgart 2009.
Hafner, Hans-Jürgen: Michael Dreyer, Berlin 2012.

Further reading
 Brandenburgischer Kunstverein: Bild und Träger und ein Pfeiler im Park Sanssouci, Kunstaspekte, 08/27/2011.
 Koch, Christian: Diskussionsprotokoll No. 11, Duisburger Filmwoche, 07.November 2012.
 Stiekele, Anette: "Enfant": Kinder übernehmen die Macht, Hamburger Abendblatt, 07/19/2011.
 Thomann, Miriam: Bis zur nächsten Runde, Texte zur Kunst, 07/15/2011.
 Von Reden, Sven: Ein Spiel mit den Grenzen des Dokumentarfilms, DerStandard, 11/12/2012.

References

1953 births
Living people
German directors
German male writers